Agony in the Garden is a 1597-1607 oil on canvas painting by El Greco. It is now in Santa María la Mayor church in Andújar.

The painter often returned to this subject of the Agony in the Garden. At the top of the work are Christ and an angel, with the apostles Peter, John and James sleeping at the bottom. Judas approaches in the right-hand background.

Bibliography 
  Álvarez Lopera, José, El Greco, Madrid, Arlanza, 2005, Biblioteca «Descubrir el Arte», (colección «Grandes maestros»). .
  Scholz-Hänsel, Michael, El Greco, Colonia, Taschen, 2003. .

External links
 

1590s paintings
1600s paintings
Paintings by El Greco
El Greco
Paintings depicting Saint Peter
Angels in art
Paintings depicting Judas Iscariot
Paintings depicting John the Apostle